Edward John Dixon was the member of the Victorian Legislative Assembly for St Kilda from 1874 until 1880, and the member for Prahran from 1889 to 1894. The Prahran Chronicle attributed his loss in 1894 to his support of the Patterson government.

References

External links
 Obituary

1833 births
1905 deaths
British emigrants to Australia